Dilly beans, or pickled green beans, are a means of preserving this summer legume.  Often flavored with dill, hence the name, they may also contain garlic, Tabasco sauce, and red pepper.  Best kept in glass jars for safekeeping over the winter months, they can be served on their own as a snack or alongside a main dish or in salad.  While they are made in kitchens all over the United States, they are particularly common in Vermont, where the overabundance of green beans produced during the short summer needs to be preserved for enjoyment during the long winter.

Dilly beans were developed as a commercial product in 1958 by Sonya Hagna and Jacquelyn Park, who made them the subject of a well-known radio advertising campaign.

References

External links
A recipe for dilly beans

Pickles
Legume dishes
Vermont cuisine